This list of the Cenozoic life of Alaska contains the various prehistoric life-forms whose fossilized remains have been reported from within the US state of Alaska and are between 66 million and 10,000 years of age.

A

  Acanthocardia
 †Acanthocardia brewerii
 Acila
 †Acila brevis – or unidentified related form
 †Acila castrensis
 †Acila ermani
 †Acila gettysburgensis
 †Acila praedivaricata – or unidentified related form
 †Acila shumardi
 †Acila taliaferroi
 Acirsa
 †Acirsa borealis
 Acmaea
 †Acmaea sybaritica
 Acrotrichis – tentative report
 †Ademete
 Agonum
 †Ainus
 Alaocybites
 †Alaocybites egorovi – tentative report
  Alces
  Alnus
 †Alnus carpinoides
 Alopex
  †Alopex lagopus
 Alvania
 †Alvania aurivillii
 Amara
 Amauropsis
 †Amauropsis fetteri – type locality for species
 Anabathron
 †Anabathron muriel
 Ancistrolepis
 †Ancistrolepis beringianus
 †Ancistrolepis eucosmius
 †Anechinocardium
 †Anechinocardium lorenzanum – or unidentified related form
 Angulus
 †Angulus lutea
 †Anomalosipho – tentative report
 Anomia – tentative report
 †Aperiploma
 †Aperiploma bainbridgensis
 Aphaenogaster
 Arca
 Arctica
 †Arctica carteriana
 †Arctica ovata
 †Arcticlam – type locality for genus
 †Arcticlam nanseni – type locality for species
  †Arctodus
 †Arctodus simus
 Argobuccinum
 †Argobuccinum oregonensis
  †Arktocara – type locality for genus
 †Arktocara yakataga – type locality for species
 Arrhenopeplus
 †Arrhenopeplus tesserula
 Asaphidion
 †Asaphidion yukonense – or unidentified comparable form
 Asinus
 †Asinus kiang – or unidentified comparable form
 Astarte
 †Astarte arctica
 †Astarte bennetti
 †Astarte borealis
 †Astarte compacta
 †Astarte crenata – or unidentified comparable form
 †Astarte hemicymata
 †Astarte laurentiana – or unidentified related form
 †Astarte martini
 †Astarte nortonensis
 †Astarte vernicosa
  Astrangia
 †Astrangia boreas – type locality for species
  †Aturia
 †Aturia alaskensis – type locality for species
 †Aturia angustata
 Axinopsida
 †Axinopsida orbiculata – or unidentified comparable form

B

 Balanus
 †Balanus balanoides
 †Balanus balanus
  †Balanus crenatus
 †Balanus evermanni
 †Balanus nubilus – or unidentified comparable form
 †Balanus rostratus
 Bembidion
 Beringius
 †Beringius crebricostatus
 †Beringius hertleini
  Betula
 Bibio
 Bison
  †Bison priscus
 Bolivina
 †Bolivina decussata
 †Bolivina pseudopicata – or unidentified comparable form
 †Bootherium
  †Bootherium bombifrons
 Boreotrophon
 †Boreotrophon beringi
 †Boreotrophon rotundatus – or unidentified comparable form
 Brachidontes
 †Brachidontes matchgaransis – or unidentified comparable form
 Brachypimpla – tentative report
  †Branchioplax
 †Branchioplax washingtoniana
 †Bruclarkia
 †Bruclarkia andersoni – or unidentified comparable form
 Buccella
 †Buccella frigida
 Buccinum
 †Buccinum angulosum
 †Buccinum glaciale
 †Buccinum kurodai – tentative report
 †Buccinum ochotense – or unidentified related form
 †Buccinum pemphigus – or unidentified comparable form
 †Buccinum percrassum
 †Buccinum physematum
 †Buccinum planeticum – or unidentified comparable form
 Bulbus
 †Bulbus fragilis
 Byrrhus

C

 Cadulus
 †Cadulus arcticus
 Calliostoma
 Callorhinus
  †Callorhinus ursinus
 Calyptraea
 †Calyptraea alaskana – or unidentified comparable form
 †Calyptraea diegoana – or unidentified comparable form
 Camponotus
 Cancellaria
 Canis
  †Canis lupus
 Carabus
 †Carabus nemoralis – or unidentified comparable form
 †Carabus truncaticollis – or unidentified comparable form
 †Carex
  Caryophyllia
 †Caryophyllia arnoldi
 Cassidulina
 †Cassidulina californica
 †Cassidulina islandica
 †Cassidulina teretis
 †Cassidulina tortuosa
 Castalia
 †Castanaea
 †Castanaea castaneaefolia
 Castanea
 †Castanea cataneaefolia
 Cepheus
 †Cepheus corae – or unidentified comparable form
 Ceratoppia – tentative report
  †Cervalces
 Cervus
  †Cervus elaphus
  Ceutorhynchus – tentative report
 Chama
 Chione
 †Chione ensifera
 Chirona
 †Chirona alaskana – type locality for species
 †Chirona evermanni
 Chlamys
 †Chlamys alaskensis
 †Chlamys albida
 †Chlamys aquilonia
 †Chlamys ashiyaensis – or unidentified related form
 †Chlamys ashiynensis
 †Chlamys coatsi
 †Chlamys cosibensis
  †Chlamys islandica
 †Chlamys nuwokensis
 †Chlamys rubida
 †Chrysodomus – tentative report
  Chrysolina
 †Chrysomelites – type locality for genus
 †Chrysomelites alaskanus – type locality for species
  Cibicides
 †Cibicides lobatulus
 Ciliatocardium
 †Ciliatocardium ciliatum
 †Ciliatocardium islandicum – or unidentified related form
 Cingula
 †Cingula martyni
  Clinocardium
 †Clinocardium californiense – or unidentified comparable form
 †Clinocardium hannibali
 †Clinocardium makiyamae
 †Clinocardium meekianum
 †Clinocardium nuttallii
 †Clinocardium pristinum
 Colus
 †Colus halibrectus – or unidentified related form
 †Colus spitsbergensis
 †Conchocele
 †Conchocele bisecta
 Corbicula
 †Corbicula bibaiensis – or unidentified comparable form
 †Corbicula muratai – or unidentified comparable form
  Corbula
 †Corbula betsyae – type locality for species
 †Cornwallius
 †Cornwallius sookensis
  †Corylus
 †Corylus macquarri
 Costacallista
 †Costacallista conradiana
 Crassatella
 †Crassatella mathewsoni – or unidentified related form
 †Crassatella nipponicus – or unidentified comparable form
 Crenella
 †Crenella kannoi – type locality for species
 †Crenella porterensis
 Crepidula
 †Crepidula ungana
 Cryptonatica
 †Cryptonatica affinis
 Cyclocardia
 †Cyclocardia belogolovensis
 †Cyclocardia crassidens
 †Cyclocardia crebricostata
 †Cyclocardia ezoensis
 †Cyclocardia nuwokensis
 †Cyclocardia roundiformis
 †Cyclocardia sakamotoi
 †Cyclocardia subcrassidens
 †Cyclocardia subnipponica – or unidentified comparable form
 †Cyclocardia tokunagai – or unidentified comparable form
 †Cyclocardia wajampolkensis – or unidentified comparable form
 †Cyclocardium
 †Cyclocardium roundiformis – or unidentified comparable form
 Cylichna
 Cyperus
 Cyrtodaria
 †Cyrtodaria katieae – type locality for species
 †Cyrtodaria kurriana
 †Cyrtodaria rutupiensis

D

 Dasiops – tentative report
  Delphinapterus – tentative report
 Dentalium
 †Dentalium nunomae – or unidentified comparable form
  †Desmatophoca – tentative report
 Diacheila
 †Diacheila matthewsi
 Dicrostonyx
 Diestothyris
 †Diestothyris frontalis
 Dioon
 †Dioon praespinulosum – type locality for species
 Diplodonta
 †Diplodonta aleutica
 †Diplodonta parilis
 †Dryophyllum
 †Dryophyllum stanleyanum
 Dyschirius

E

  Echinarachnius
 Echinophoria
 †Echinophoria apta
 †Ellipsoscapha
 †Ellipsoscapha sohli – type locality for species
 Elphidiella
 †Elphidiella arctica
 Elphidium
 †Elphidium alaskense
 †Elphidium clavatum
 †Elphidium frigidum
  Enhydra
 Enicmus
 †Epipremnum
 †Epipremnum crassum
 Epitonium
 †Epitonium atwoodi
 †Epitonium greenlandicum
 Equus
 †Equus alaskae
 Erignathus
  †Erignathus barbatus
 Erigone
  Eschrichtius
 Eumetopias
 †Eumetopias jubata
 †Eumorphocorystes
 †Eumorphocorystes naselensis
 Euspira
 †Euspira pallida
 Evalea
 †Exilia – tentative report

F

  †Flabellaria
 †Flabellaria gronlandica
 Fortipecten
 †Fortipecten hallae
 Fulgoraria

G

 Gari
 †Gari brouwersae – type locality for species
 Georissus
 Globigerina
  †Globigerina bulloides – or unidentified related form
 †Globigerina pachyderma
 Glycymeris
 †Glycymeris sagittatus
 †Glycymeris septentrionalis

H

 †Hataiella
 †Hataiella chichibuensis – or unidentified comparable form
 †Hataiella sagai
 Helophorus
 †Helophorus splendidus
 Hemithiris
 †Hemithiris psittacea
 Hiatella
 †Hiatella arctica
 Hinnites – tentative report
 Histriophoca
  †Histriophoca fasciata
 Homalopoma – tentative report
 †Hydrodamalis
  †Hydrodamalis gigas

I

 †Integricardium
 †Integricardium kennae – type locality for species
  Isurus

J

 †Jugina
 †Jugina snigella
 †Juglna
 †Juglna snigella

K

 Kalissus
 †Kalissus nitidus
 Karreriella
 †Karreriella baccata
 †Kolponomos – or unidentified comparable form
 Kurtiella
 †Kurtiella tumida

L

 Lasiopodomys
 †Lasiopodomys deceitensis
 †Lastraea
 †Lastraea stiriaca
 Lathrobium
  Laurus
 Leistus
 Lemmus
  †Lemmus sibiricus
 Leptothorax
 Leukoma
 †Leukoma staylei – or unidentified comparable form
 Limatula
 †Limatula attenuata
 Liocyma
 †Liocyma fluctuosa
 Liomesus
 †Liomesus nux
 Littorina
 †Littorina sitchana
 †Lora
 †Lora skullcliffensis
 Lucinoma
 †Lucinoma acutilineata
  Lunatia
 †Lunatia groenlandica – or unidentified related form
 Lyonsia
 †Lyonsia mooreae

M

  Macoma
 †Macoma albaria
 †Macoma astori
 †Macoma balthica – or unidentified related form
 †Macoma brota – or unidentified related form
 †Macoma calcarea
 †Macoma golikovi
 †Macoma moesta
 †Macoma optiva
 †Macoma twinensis
 Macrocallista – tentative report
 Mactromeris
 †Mactromeris albaria
 †Mactromeris brevirostrata
 †Mactromeris polynyma
  Magnolia
 †Magnolia inglefieldi
  †Mammut
 †Mammuthus
  †Mammuthus primigenius
 Margarites
 †Margarites peninsularis
  Marmota
 Martesia – tentative report
 Mathilda
 †Mathilda amundseni – type locality for species
 Megayoldia
 †Megayoldia montereyensis – or unidentified related form
 Messor
 †Metacarcinus
 †Metacarcinus goederti
 Micridium
 Micropeplus
 †Micropeplus hoogendorni – type locality for species
 †Micropeplus hopkinsi – type locality for species
 Microtus
 Miodontiscus
 †Miodontiscus prolongatus
 Mizuhopecten
 †Mizuhopecten mollerensis
 Modiolus
 †Modiolus harrimani
 †Molopophorus
 †Molopophorus bogachielii – or unidentified comparable form
 Musculus
  †Musculus niger
 †Mya
  †Mya arenaria – or unidentified comparable form
 †Mya elegans
 †Mya grewingki
 †Mya truncata
  Myrica
 †Myrica arctogale
 †Mytilon – type locality for genus
 †Mytilon theresae – type locality for species
 Mytilus
 †Mytilus coalingensis
 †Mytilus edulis
 †Mytilus gratacapi
 †Mytilus middendorffi
 †Mytilus pholadis

N

 Namunaria
 Natica
 †Natica janthostoma
 †Natica oregonensis
  Nebria
 †Neilo
 †Neilo gryci – type locality for species
 Nemocardium
 †Nemocardium exoense
 Neoconorbina
 †Neoconorbina tabernacularis
 Neopilumnoplax
 †Neopilumnoplax hannibalanus
 Neptunea
 †Neptunea elatior – or unidentified comparable form
 †Neptunea heros
 †Neptunea leffingwelli
 †Neptunea lyrata
 †Neptunea modesta – or unidentified related form
 †Neptunea plafkeri
 †Neptunea tabulata – or unidentified comparable form
 †Neptunea ventricosa
 Neverita
 †Neverita washingtonensis
  Notiophilus
 †Notiophilus aeneus – or unidentified comparable form
  Nucula
 †Nucula micheleae – type locality for species
 Nuculana
 †Nuculana fossa
 †Nuculana moriyai – type locality for species
 †Nuculana morrisi

O

 Ochotona
 †Ochotona whartoni
 Odobenus
  †Odobenus rosmarus
 Oenopota
 †Oenopota candida
 †Oenopota laevigata
 Oolina
 †Oolina borealis
 †Orbitoplax – type locality for genus
 †Orbitoplax plafkeri – type locality for species
 Oribatella – tentative report
 †Orodaphne
  †Osmunda
 †Osmunda doroschkiana
 Ostrea
 †Ostrea lincolnensis – or unidentified related form
 †Ostrea tigiliana
 †Ostrea trigiliana – or unidentified comparable form
 †Ounalashkastylus – type locality for genus
 †Ounalashkastylus tomidai – type locality for species
 Ovibos
  †Ovibos moschatus
  Ovis
 †Ovis dalli – tentative report
 †Oxytoma
 †Oxytoma hargrovei – type locality for species

P

  Pagophilus
 †Pagophilus groenlandica
 Palliolum
 †Palliolum groenlandicum
 Pandora
 †Pandora wardiana
 Panomya
 †Panomya ampla
 †Panomya izumo
 †Panomya trapezoidis
 Papyridea
 †Papyridea harrimani
 Parapholas – tentative report
 †Parapholas california
 †Parasyrinx
 Patrobus
 †Patrobus septentrionis – or unidentified comparable form
 Penitella
 Periploma
 †Periploma aleutica
 †Periploma besshoense
 †Periploma fragilis – or unidentified related form
 †Perse
 Phenacomys
 †Phenacomys deeringensis
 Phoca
 †Phoca hispida
  †Phoca vitulina
 Picea
 †Picea glauca
  †Picea mariana
 †Picea sitchensis – or unidentified comparable form
 Pinus
  †Pinus monticola
  Pitar
 †Pitar angustifrons
 †Pitar avenalensis – or unidentified comparable form
 †Pitar dalli – or unidentified related form
 †Placunopsis
 †Placunopsis rothi – type locality for species
  †Planera
 †Planera ungeri
 Planulina
 †Planulina alaskensis
 Plicifusus
 †Plicifusus kroyeri – or unidentified related form
 Pododesmus
  †Pododesmus macrochisma
 Polinices
 †Polinices diabloensis
 †Polinices lincolnensis – or unidentified comparable form
 †Polinices pallidus
 †Polinices ramonensis
 †Polinices repenningi – type locality for species
 Polymorphina
 †Polymorphina kincaidi
  Populus
 †Populus balsamoides
 †Populus glandulifera
 Portlandia
 †Portlandia ovata
 †Portlandia watasei
 †Portunites
 †Portunites alaskensis
 †Praeovibos
 †Predicrostonyx
 †Predicrostonyx hopkinsi
 †Priscofusus
 †Priscofusus clarki
 †Priscofusus stewarti – or unidentified related form
 †Protocardia – tentative report
 †Protochelydra
 †Protochelydra zangerli – or unidentified comparable form
 Protothaca
 †Protothaca staleyi
 Pseudarchaster
 Pteris
 †Pteris sitkensis
 Pterostichus
 †Pterostichus corvinus – or unidentified comparable form
 †Pterostichus vermiculosus – or unidentified comparable form
 Puncturella
 †Puncturella longifissa
 Purpura
 †Purpura crispata – or unidentified related form
  Pusa – or unidentified related form
 †Pusa hispida
 Pyrgo
 †Pyrgo elongata – or unidentified comparable form
 Pyrulofusus
 †Pyrulofusus schraderi

Q

  Quercus
 Quinqueloculina
 †Quinqueloculina agglutinata
 †Quinqueloculina akneriana
 †Quinqueloculina seminulum

R

 Rangifer
  †Rangifer tarandus
 Raninoides
 †Raninoides vaderensis
 Rhabdus
 †Rhabdus schencki – or unidentified comparable form
 Rosalina
 †Rosalina wrightii
 †Rotalia
 †Rotalia columbiensis

S

  Saiga
 Saxidomus
 †Saxidomus callistaeformis – or unidentified comparable form
 †Saxidomus hanzawai
 Scaphander
 †Scaphander lignarius – or unidentified comparable form
 †Scutella
 †Scutella gabbi
 Sequoia
 †Sequoia couttsiae – tentative report
 †Sequoia langsdorfii
 †Sequoia nordenskioldi – tentative report
 Serripes
 †Serripes groenlandicus
 †Serripes hamiltonensis
 †Serripes laperousii
 †Shedocardia – tentative report
 Siliqua
 †Siliqua alta – or unidentified comparable form
 Similipecten
 †Similipecten greenlandicus
 Simplocaria
  Siphonalia
 †Siphonalia sakakurai – or unidentified related form
 †Skeneopsis
 †Skeneopsis alaskana
 Solamen
 †Solamen leana
 Solena
  Sorex
 Spermophilus
 †Spermophilus undulatus
 Spirorbis
 Spirotropis
 †Spirotropis perversa – or unidentified comparable form
 Spisula
 †Spisula addicotti
 †Spisula callistaeformis
 †Spisula eugenense – or unidentified related form
 †Spisula hannibali – or unidentified comparable form
 Stenus
 †Streptochetus – tentative report
 Strongylocentrotus
  †Strongylocentrotus droebachiensis
  †Symphoricarpos

T

 Tachinus
 †Tachinus apertus – or unidentified comparable form
 Tachyrhynchus
 †Tachyrhynchus erosus
 †Tancredia
 †Tancredia slavichi – type locality for species
 †Taxites
 †Taxites olriki
 Taxodium
  †Taxodium distichum
 †Taxodium dubium
 †Taxodium occidentale
 †Taxodium tinajorum
 Tellina
 †Tellina aragonia
 †Tellinimera
 †Tellinimera kauffmani – type locality for species
 Terebratula
 †Terebratula retusa – or unidentified related form
 Terebratulina
 †Terebratulina retusa – or unidentified related form
 Thracia
 †Thracia condoni
 †Thracia septentrionalis – or unidentified related form
 Thyasira
 †Thyasira arctica
  Tonicella
 †Tonicella marmorea
 †Trichohyalis
 †Trichohyalis ornatissima
 Trichotropis
 †Trichotropis bicarinata
 †Triloculine
 †Triloculine trigonula
 †Tsuga
  †Tsuga heterophylla
  Turritella
 †Turritella uvasana
 Turtonia
 †Turtonia minuta
 †Tymolus
 †Tymolus alaskensis – type locality for species
 †Tyrannoberingius
 †Tyrannoberingius rex
 †Tyrranoberingius
 †Tyrranoberingius rex

U

  Ulmus
 Ursus
 †Uya
 †Uya arenaria – or unidentified related form

V

  †Vaccinium
 Venericardia
 †Venericardia clarki – or unidentified related form
 Veraphis – tentative report
 †Vertipecten
 Vitavitus
 †Vitavitus thulius – or unidentified comparable form
 Vitis
 †Vitis olriki
 Volutopsius
 †Volutopsius stefanssoni – or unidentified related form
 Vulpes
  †Vulpes vulpes

X

  Xysticus
 †Xysticus archaeopalpus – type locality for species

Y

 Yoldia
 †Yoldia breweri – or unidentified comparable form
 †Yoldia emersoni – or unidentified comparable form
 †Yoldia gladenkovi – type locality for species
 †Yoldia palachei – or unidentified comparable form
 †Yoldia scissurata
 †Yoldia sobrina
 Yoldiella
 †Yoldiella scissurata

References

 

Cenozoic
Cenozoic Alaska
Alaska
Alaska-related lists